Due Process is an online multiplayer tactical first-person shooter video game developed by American studio Giant Enemy Crab, and published by Annapurna Interactive released into early access on November 4, 2020. The game's core revolves around teamwork and communication, allowing players to draw a "playbook" during the planning phase onto the hand-curated, procedurally generated maps. The visuals are inspired by '90s arcade light gun games, such as Time Crisis, and it is set in a cyberpunk dystopia.

Due Process is currently only available for Microsoft Windows. Closed alpha testing started in 2019.

Gameplay 
Matches are multiplayer, composed of a team of five players on defense versus a team of five players on offense. Every match begins with a planning phase where players may discuss strategy, gear up, and draw a "playbook" on the map. After planning, the combat begins.
Maps are procedurally generated and then hand-curated resulting in a very interesting and new type of game. There are currently 5 tile sets in the game (Dome, Factory, Killhouse, C-store, and Bank). In any given match you will play three rounds of attacking, and three rounds of defending. In a ranked game mode you will play six with alternating after each three.

Maps are procedurally generated, allowing the developers to add a large number of maps quickly via smaller updates. There are currently 5 tile sets within the game, with around ~150 maps in the rotation at any given time split between the 5 tile sets. All the maps are procedurally generated and then curated to ensure proper gameplay flow. With the increased ease of maps updates, player familiarity which each specific map type is decreased, requiring players to focus on map strategy during the tactical window prior to deployment, heightening the necessity for pre-match teamwork.

E-Sports 
Due Process League (or DPL) is the primary form of competitive e-sports in the game. Due Process League contains 0 registered teams and 300+ registered players which is organized in the DPL Discord. Due Process League teams compete against one another, commonly streamed on Twitch, with the VOD uploaded to YouTube.

References

External links 
 Official Due Process website
Official DPL website
Due Process Twitch
Due Process Youtube

Cyberpunk video games
First-person shooters
Indie video games
Multiplayer online games
Upcoming video games
Video games developed in the United States
Video games using procedural generation
Windows games
Windows-only games
Annapurna Interactive games
Tactical shooter video games
Video games about police officers